South China Sea Fleet, China Marine Surveillance is under command of both South China Sea Branch, State Oceanic Administration and China Marine Surveillance.

Overview 
South China Sea Fleet (CMS)'s headquarters is at Guangzhou, Guangdong.

Organization 
 7th Marine Surveillance Flotilla. Homeport: Haizhu, Guangzhou, Guangdong.
 8th Marine Surveillance Flotilla. Homeport: Huangpu, Guangzhou, Guangdong.
 9th Marine Surveillance Flotilla (. Homeport: Beihai, Guangxi.
 South China Sea Air Wing. Base:?

References 

China Marine Surveillance
South China Sea